Thomas Leleu (born in August 1987) is a French tuba player. He was born in Lille, France. He is the first tuba player to have ever won the award "Revelation Instrumental Soloist of the Year" at the annual French classical music award event, the Victoires de la musique classique. 
At only 28 years of age, Thomas Leleu is considered as "the young world star of the tuba".
He is the younger brother of French trumpet player Romain Leleu.

Biography 
Thomas Leleu was born in Lille in August 1987 into a family of musicians.

Early career 
Thomas Leleu started to play the tuba with his father and later studied with François Thuillier and Philippe Legris. He joined the Conservatoire de Paris (the CNSM, Higher National Conservatory of Music and Dance in Paris) at age 17, having won the first prize of the open competition, and joined the tuba class of Gérard Buquet and Bernard Neuranter and the chamber music class of Jens Mc Manama. After a three-year training course he obtained the first prize for tuba and a degree awarded with distinctions. 
Thomas Leleu earned awards in several competitions throughout the world such as in Markneukirchen - Germany, Jeju City - South Korea, and Luxembourg.

Classical career 
He has been principal tubist with the Opera de Marseille since he turned 19.
Thomas Leleu gives soloist concerts and master classes all around the world (France, Argentina, Venezuela, Belgium, Spain, Italy, Brazil, Austria, China, South Korea, Japan, Hungary...) and plays solo parts with various orchestras (Orchestre National d’Île-de-France, Orchestre Philharmonique de Marseille, Orchestre d’Avignon Provence OLRAP, Orchestre Symphonique de Lara – Venezuela-, Orchestre Symphonique de Santa Fe - Argentine -, Orchestre Symphonique de Jeju – Corée de Sud –, Orchester des  (Germany), Orchestre de la Police Nationale...).

In March 2013, Thomas created the Fables of Tuba composed by Richard Galliano and in May 2015 he created the concerto for tuba and piano by the famous composer Vladimir Cosma.

Thomas is also Ambassador of Buffet Crampon and a Meinl-Weston Artist since 2011. He has contributed with the German firm to the creation of his own tuba : the 2250TL French Touch, which he has been playing since 2011.

Discography 
On Fondamenta :
 In the Mood for Tuba

References

External links 
 
 Thomas Leleu on Facebook
 Melton Meinl Weston artist page

1987 births
Living people
Musicians from Lille
Conservatoire de Paris alumni
French classical tubists
Contemporary classical music performers
21st-century tubists